Khosrov of Andzev (died 964) was the father of Gregory of Narek, a tenth century poet. His two sons, Grigor and Hovhannes, studied at Narek monastery under abbot Anania Narekasti. He mainly wrote on topics such as the Armenian Apostolic Church and its ceremonies.

References 
The Heritage of Armenian Literature: From the Sixth to the Eighteenth Century By Agop Jack Hacikyan, Gabriel. Basmajian, Edward S. Franchuk - Page 244

10th-century Armenian poets
964 deaths
Year of birth unknown
Andzevatsi family
Armenian male poets